Barbudan may refer to:
 Something of, or related to Barbuda.  See also the country, Antigua and Barbuda.
 A person from Barbuda, or of Barbudan descent. For information about the Barbudan people, see Demographics of Barbuda and Culture of Antigua and Barbuda.
 Note that there is no language called "Barbudan".  See Languages of Antigua and Barbuda.

See also 
 Barbuda (disambiguation)
 Antiguan (disambiguation)
 

Language and nationality disambiguation pages